Government Higher Secondary School is located in Velliyanai, Karur, India. It is a State Board school with 20 faculty members.

The school was launched in 1996. This school's primary medium of instruction is Tamil language, with English as secondary medium, and the student teacher ratio is 18:1. 

Tamil-language schools
Educational institutions established in 1996
High schools and secondary schools in Tamil Nadu
1996 establishments in Tamil Nadu